The One AM Radio is a band consisting of Hrishikesh Hirway, a composer and songwriter from Los Angeles. The One AM Radio's sound is often characterized by Hirway's lush vocals over dream-like instrumental arrangements. He does most of his own recording, playing several of the instruments and producing all the beats; the style borders electronica, folk, post-rock, chamber music, and ambient music.

Born in Massachusetts, Hirway began The One AM Radio while a student at Yale University, where he studied art and film.

Songs by The One AM Radio have appeared in the television shows Chuck, Gossip Girl, One Tree Hill, in ads for Pontiac and Rdio, and the films Save the Date and The End of Love. The One AM Radio's second album, A Name Writ In Water, was named by Time Out New York as one of the top 10 albums of 2004.

Discography

Albums 
Heaven Is Attached By A Slender Thread (2011), Dangerbird Records
This Too Will Pass (2007), Dangerbird Records
A Name Writ In Water (2004), Level Plane Records
The Hum of the Electric Air! (2002), CD released by Translucence and Alone Records, LP released by The Electric Human Project

Remixes 
 Now, Now - Thread (The One AM Radio Remix) (2013)
 Sea Wolf - "Old Friend (The One AM Radio Remix featuring Abigail Spencer) (2013)
 Poliça - "Wandering Star" (The One AM Radio Remix) (2012)
 Giraffage feat. XXYYXX - "Even Though (The One AM Radio Remix)" (2012)
 Dntel - "Rock My Boat (The One AM Radio Version)" (2011)
 Baths - "Hall (The One AM Radio Remix feat. The Los Feliz Ladies Choir)" (2010)
 James Figurine - "Apologies (The One AM Radio Remix)" (2009)
 Lymbyc Systym - "Astrology Days (Remix by The One AM Radio)" (2008)
 Silversun Pickups - "Little Lover's So Polite (The One AM Radio Remix)" (2007)

Guest Appearances 
 alias - "The Weathering", on Resurgam (2008)
 Caural - "Cold Hands", on Mirrors For Eyes (2006)
 Daedelus - "Thanatopsis", on Exquisite Corpse (2005)

EPs 
On the Shore of the Wide World (2005), Level Plane
An Assembly (2003), Translucence
A Cloud's Fear of Kites : A Kite's Fear of Heights (2000), Garbage Czar

7”s 
"Accidents & Good Intentions" (2012)
Credible Threats (2010)
I Think This Is My Exit (2002), Troubleman Unlimited

Splits 
Night Falls split CD/12" with The Wind-Up Bird, CD released 2002 on Alone Records; 12-inch released 2006 on Paramnesia
split CD with Tracy Shedd (2002), Translucence and Alone Records
split 7-inch with Jeromes Dream (2001), Garbage Czar
split 7-inch/CD with Ted Leo and the Pharmacists, 7-inch released 1999 on Garbage Czar Records; CD single released 2003 on Translucence

Compilation Appearances 
 "Old Men" on Give Listen Help, Volume 5 (2008), Urban Outfitters/Filter Magazine
 "You Can Still Run" on 80 Records And We're Still Not Broke (Yet) (2005), Level Plane
 "Shortest Day of the Year" on Tea at the Palaz of Hoon (1998), Cosmodemonic Telegraph

Production 
 Eulogies by Eulogies, co-producer (Dangerbird, 2007)
 Tempted to Do Nothing EP by Eulogies, co-producer (Dangerbird, 2008)
 Here Anonymous by Eulogies, co-producer (Dangerbird, 2009)

References

External links 
 http://theoneamradio.com/ Official site
 Myspace page
 [ Allmusic page]
 2008 The One AM Radio Interview at Bandega.com
 Pitchfork Media Review of This Too Will Pass
 Pitchfork Media Review of A Name Writ in Water
 Cokemachineglow.com interview

American singer-songwriters
Indian-American culture
Level Plane Records artists
Dangerbird Records artists